Karlo Hmeljak (born 8 March 1983 in Koper) is a Slovenian sailor and poet. He competed at the 2008 Summer Olympics in the men's 470 two-person dinghy with Mitja Nevečny and in the 2012 Summer Olympics in the Men's Laser class.

References

Living people
Olympic sailors of Slovenia
Slovenian male sailors (sport)
Sailors at the 2008 Summer Olympics – 470
Sailors at the 2012 Summer Olympics – Laser
Sportspeople from Koper
1983 births
Veronika Award laureates
Soling class world champions
21st-century Slovenian people